The 1975 Lehigh Engineers football team was an American football team that represented Lehigh University as an independent during the 1975 NCAA Division II football season. Lehigh lost in the quarterfinal round of the national playoffs, but won the Lambert Cup.

In their 11th and final year under head coach Fred Dunlap, the Engineers compiled a 9–3 record (9–2  in the regular season). Jerry Mullane and Joe Sterrett were the team captains.

Unranked at the start of the year, the Engineers first appeared in the 1975 Division II national polls in late October, climbing to No. 4 in the coaches poll before a late-season loss to Bucknell dropped them to No. 6, their final coaches poll position. In the AP writers poll, Lehigh ended the regular season ranked No. 11, but the final poll was released after the playoffs, and Lehigh did not rank in the top 15.

Lehigh won the Lambert Cup, awarded to the best team from a mid-sized college in the East. 
The Engineers also qualified for its second NCAA Division II national playoff in three years, but lost in the first round to No. 8  New Hampshire.

Lehigh played its home games, including its playoff game, at Taylor Stadium on the university campus in Bethlehem, Pennsylvania.

Schedule

References

Lehigh
Lehigh Mountain Hawks football seasons
Lehigh Engineers football